Iwan Gilkin (7 January 1858 – 28 September 1924) was a Belgian poet. Born in Brussels, Gilkin was associated with the Symbolist school in Belgium.

His works include Les ténèbres (1892, featuring a frontispiece by Odilon Redon) and Le Sphinx (1907). Linked with the development of the literary revue the Parnasse de la Jeune Belgique, he was an early appreciator of the Comte de Lautréamont's infamous work, Les Chants de Maldoror, and sent several copies of the book to his friends, including fellow poet Léon Bloy.

His mature works, which often concerned difficult religious and philosophical themes, reflect a highly pessimistic, spiritual and anti-positivistic outlook, influenced by Charles Baudelaire and Arthur Schopenhauer. A French-language study of Gilkin by Henri Liebrecht was published in 1941.

Bibliography
 La Damnation de l'artiste (1890)
 Ténèbres (1892)
 Stances dorées (1893)
 La Nuit (1893) 
 Prométhée (1897)
 Le Cerisier fleuri (1899)
 Jonas (1900)
 Savonarole (1906)
 Étudiants russes (1906)
 Le Sphinx (1907)
 Le Roi Cophétua (1919)
 Les Pieds d'argile (1921)
 Egmont (1926)

References

External links
Online Book With Translations of Iwan Gilkin Poems by James Kirkup

Belgian poets in French
1858 births
1924 deaths
Decadent literature
Members of the Académie royale de langue et de littérature françaises de Belgique